Hadleigh may refer to:

Hadleigh, Suffolk, a town in Suffolk
Hadleigh Railway, a seven and a half mile long single-track railway branch-line from Bentley to Hadleigh, Suffolk (now closed)
Hadleigh High School, a high school in Hadleigh, Suffolk
Hadleigh railway station, a railway station in Hadleigh, Suffolk
Hadleigh United F.C., a football club in Hadleigh, Suffolk
Hadleigh, Essex, a town in Essex
Hadleigh Bus Depot, one of the depots used by First Essex
Hadleigh Castle, a castle near Hadleigh, Essex
Hadleigh (TV series), a British television series made by Yorkshire Television
Boze Hadleigh, an American journalist who writes of celebrity gossip and entertainment
HMS Hadleigh Castle (K355), a Castle-class corvette of Britain's Royal Navy
Hadleigh Heath, a hamlet near Hadleigh, Suffolk

See also
 Hadley (disambiguation)
 Headley (disambiguation)
 Hedley (disambiguation)